Special Messenger is a 1911 American silent film produced by Kalem Company and distributed by General Film. It was directed by Sidney Olcott with himself, Gene Gauntier and JP McGowan in the leading roles.

Cast
 Gene Gauntier
 Sidney Olcott
 JP McGowan

Production notes

External links
 
 Special Messenger website dedicated to Sidney Olcott

1911 films
American silent short films
Films directed by Sidney Olcott
1911 short films
American black-and-white films
1910s American films
Silent thriller films